Bengt Holst (born 14 May 1952) is a Danish biologist who, until his retirement at the end of 2020, was scientific director at Copenhagen Zoo.

Holst received a MSc in biology from the University of Copenhagen in 1983. Thereafter, Holst was employed as a zoologist and research assistant at Copenhagen Zoo. In 1988, Holst became head of the animal department and in 1994 deputy director and scientific director.

Holst has participated in Denmark Radio's scientific radio programs Leksikon og Viden Om. In 2012, he became chairman of the Animal Ethics Council.

Controversy 

Bengt Holst became well known in February 2014, when he appeared as a spokesman for Copenhagen Zoo in the Danish and international press to tell about the decision to autopsy the giraffe Marius in front of an audience. Holst explained that sending Marius to another zoo would have opened the door to gene concentrations and inbreeding, and another giraffe with a more diverse genetic makeup would be more valuable for future offspring in zoo breeding programs.

Danish Nature Fund appointment 

After retiring as Scientific Director of the Copenhagen Zoo on 31 December 2020, the Danish Minister of the Environment appointed Holst as the new chairman of the Danish Nature Fund.

Written works 
 Editor in chief, "Verdens Dyreliv – et illustreret opslagsværk om dyreriget" (2007). Forlaget Globe. .
 Translation and adaptation into Danish, "Politikkens bog om pattedyr" (2003). "Politikkens forlag"

References 

1952 births
Living people